Broods is the debut extended play (EP) by New Zealand music duo Broods, first released digitally 31 January 2014 in select territories through Dryden Street, Island Records Australia and Universal Music Australia as the duo's debut studio effort. It was preceded by lead single "Bridges", which became a top-10 hit in their native New Zealand.

Reception

Chris Schulz of The New Zealand Herald rated Broods four-and-a-half stars out of five, and praised the quality of the writing of the songs.

Broods debuted at number two on the New Zealand Albums Chart dated 10 February 2014, below Lorde's Pure Heroine. It reached number 30 on the Australian Albums Chart, and number 5 on the US Heatseekers Albums, number 45 on the US Top Rock Albums and number 164 on the US Billboard 200.

Track listing
All tracks written by Caleb Nott, Georgia Nott and Joel Little.
"Never Gonna Change" – 4:11
"Pretty Thing" – 3:17
"Bridges" – 3:11
"Sleep Baby Sleep" – 3:00
"Taking You There" – 3:09
"Coattails" – 3:15

Charts

Release history

References

2014 debut EPs
Broods albums
EPs by New Zealand artists
Indie pop EPs